Herbert Henri Jasper  (July 27, 1906 –  March 11, 1999) was a Canadian psychologist, physiologist, neurologist, and epileptologist.

Born in La Grande, Oregon, he attended Reed College in Portland, Oregon and received his PhD in psychology from the University of Iowa in 1931 and earned a Doctor of Science degree from the University of Paris for research in neurobiology.

From 1946 to 1964 he was Professor of Experimental Neurology at the Montreal Neurological Institute, McGill University and then from 1965 to 1976 he was Professor of Neurophysiology, Université de Montréal. He did his most important research with Wilder Penfield at McGill University. He was a member of the American Academy of Neurology and the American Association for the Advancement of Science. He was also a member of the Canadian Neurological Society and the Royal Society of Medicine. He wrote more than 350 scientific publications.

Honours
 In 1972 he was made an Officer of the Order of Canada. 
 In 1981 he was awarded the Ralph W. Gerard Prize in Neuroscience.
 In 1982 he was awarded the Karl Spencer Lashley Award.
 In 1985 he was awarded the McLaughlin Medal by the Royal Society of Canada.
 In 1995 he was inducted into the Canadian Medical Hall of Fame.
 In 1995 he received the Albert Einstein World Award of Science
 In 1996 he was made a Grand Officer of the National Order of Quebec.

References

External links
 Herbert Henri Jasper (1906 – 1999): An Appreciation
 Herbert H. Jasper Fonds McGill University Library & Archives.
1991 (video) Dr. Herbert H. Jasper interviewed by Andre Olivier, American association of neurological surgeons (biography talk) (watch online)
1995 (video) Dr. Herbert Jasper Canadian Medical Hall of Fame Laureate (talk about his work with Wilder Penfield) (watch online)

Albert Einstein World Award of Science Laureates
Canadian neurologists
Canadian neuroscientists
Canadian psychologists
Electroencephalographers
Fellows of the Royal Society of Canada
University of Iowa alumni
Reed College alumni
Grand Officers of the National Order of Quebec
Officers of the Order of Canada
Canadian Presbyterians
American expatriates in France
American emigrants to Canada
1906 births
1999 deaths
People from La Grande, Oregon
Canadian physiologists
Canadian epileptologists
20th-century psychologists